First Nations Experience (FNX) is a non-profit television network in San Bernardino, California, owned by the San Bernardino Community College District. The network, created by Executive Director Charles Fox, is broadcast from the KVCR-TV studios located on the campus of San Bernardino Valley College. FNX is America's first and only broadcast network aimed at Native Americans and global Indigenous audiences and consumers of Native American culture.

History
First Nation Experience was launched under the leadership of Executive Director Charles Fox on September 25, 2011, through a $6 million gift from its founding partner, the San Manuel Band of Mission Indians. On November 1, 2014, FNX became available via satellite to hundreds of non-profit public television service providers across the United States including public broadcasting TV stations (especially PBS member stations), community, tribal, religious, and others.  On this date, FNX became available via satellite receiver set to 125° West from the PBS Satellite Service. In 2015, the San Manuel Band awarded FNX a second $6 million gift to help expand the station. The network currently reaches 47 million viewers in the United States.

Affiliates

See also
World Indigenous Television Broadcasters Network
Sacheen Littlefeather

References

External links
 First Nations Experience

Public television in the United States
Television stations in California
PBS member networks
Mass media in San Bernardino, California
Indigenous peoples of California topics
Television channels and stations established in 2011
2011 establishments in California
Native American television